Racines may refer to:

Racines, the Italian name for Ratschings, in South Tyrol, Italy
Racines, Aube, a commune in the department of Aube, France
Racines, an album by Matt Houston

See also
 Racine (disambiguation)